The 2000 UK & Ireland Greyhound Racing Year was the 74th year of greyhound racing in the United Kingdom and Ireland.

Roll of honour

Summary
The National Greyhound Racing Club (NGRC) released the annual returns, with totalisator turnover at £86,014,070 and attendances recorded at 3,697,939 from 6643 meetings.

Palace Issue trained by Linda Mullins was voted Greyhound of the Year after winning the St Leger at Wimbledon Stadium, defending his Grand Prix title at Walthamstow, winning a third successive Hunt Cup and second WJ & JE Cearns Invitation. Mullins also won the Greyhound Trainer of the Year for the fifth successive year and then announced her retirement, the kennels and licence was switched to one of her sons John.

El Tenor owned by Mario Lanfranchi and trained by Mullins brought up the magical 100 open race wins to write his name in the history books as one of the greatest hurdlers. Rising star Rapid Ranger was third in the Scottish Greyhound Derby behind Knockeevan Star and then went on to win the 2000 English Greyhound Derby.

Tracks
Irish tracks were subject to changes. The Dundalk Ramparts Greyhound Stadium closed on 20 November in order for the major rebuild to take place. Curraheen Park opened on 8 April as a replacement for the previous track the Cork (Western Road) Greyhound Stadium, the sale of the old track enabled the Irish Greyhound Board to fund a new stadium with modern facilities. The Kingdom Greyhound Stadium in Tralee also underwent a major refit as the stadium was redesigned for the new Millennium.

Swaffham ceased to race after the promoter Tom Smith and the holder of the lease Vince Moody had a disagreement, the track had raced for 13 years and was turned into a schooling facility. Tom Smith and son Gavin Smith would leave a lasting legacy however as they were responsible for producing the 'Swaffham hare'. During a ten-year period they had produced a hare system that would replace just about every other hare system; the McGee, outside Sumner, inside Sumner and Bramich would all but disappear.

News
The Supertrack competition inaugurated in 1994 is officially ended by the British Greyhound Racing Board. Harlow lost three trainers in quick succession; Jean Carter moved to Crayford, Wayne Wilson to Catford and Kay Wyatt to Sittingbourne. Wyatt would soon give up training and Maxine Locke would take over the kennels and contract at Sittingbourne. Hazel Dickson retired leaving Wimbledon for other interests outside of greyhound racing; she had never recovered from the day that Wembley closed.

Nick Savva won the trainers championship and trained 93 British Bred winners in one year, only Trevor Cobbold in 1994 had produced a more. Catford Racing Manager Phil Donaldson left for a career in journalism with the Racing Post with his assistant Derek Hope taking over. Crayford also lost their Racing Manager after Paul Lawrence left to be replaced by deputy Harry Bull with Danny Rayment promoted to deputy.

Competitions
Catford hosted their last Cesarewitch before it switched to Oxford.

Principal UK races

Principal Irish finals

Totalisator returns

The totalisator returns declared to the National Greyhound Racing Club for the year 2000 are listed below. Although the tracks are listed in the order of largest to smallest turnover the actual figures were not released (with the exception of Wimbledon).

References 

Greyhound racing in the United Kingdom
Greyhound racing in the Republic of Ireland
UK and Ireland Greyhound Racing Year
UK and Ireland Greyhound Racing Year
UK and Ireland Greyhound Racing Year
UK and Ireland Greyhound Racing Year